Vitaliy Mohilenko (born 5 July 1965) is a Ukrainian biathlete. He competed in the men's 20 km individual event at the 1994 Winter Olympics.

References

External links
 

1965 births
Living people
Ukrainian male biathletes
Olympic biathletes of Ukraine
Biathletes at the 1994 Winter Olympics
Sportspeople from Sumy